The name Jeanne was used for three tropical cyclones in the Atlantic Ocean.

 Hurricane Jeanne (1980) – a rare November hurricane in the Gulf of Mexico that caused no significant damage.
 Hurricane Jeanne (1998) – brushed Cape Verde and travelled over the Azores as an extratropical storm.
 Hurricane Jeanne (2004) – Strong category 3 hurricane that formed in the Lesser Antilles September 14 and travelled across Puerto Rico and Hispaniola as a tropical storm, causing over 3,000 deaths in Haiti. Crossed the Bahamas and made landfall near Stuart, Florida.

The name Jeanne was retired after the 2004 season and was replaced by Julia in the 2010 season.

The name Jeanne was also used for one tropical cyclone in the Western Pacific.

 Tropical Storm Jeanne (1952) (T5208)

Atlantic hurricane set index articles
Pacific typhoon set index articles